Camellia euphlebia is a species of plant in the family Theaceae. It is found in China and Vietnam. It is threatened by habitat loss.

References

euphlebia
Vulnerable plants
Taxonomy articles created by Polbot